The 2020 Ontario Scotties Tournament of Hearts, the provincial women's curling championship for Southern Ontario, was held from January 27 to February 1 at the Ed Lumley Arena in Cornwall, Ontario. The winning Rachel Homan rink represented Ontario at the 2020 Scotties Tournament of Hearts in Moose Jaw, Saskatchewan and lost the gold medal final to Manitoba. The event was held in conjunction with the 2020 Ontario Tankard, the men's provincial championship.

Rachel Homan's rink from the Ottawa Curling Club completed their perfect undefeated run when they defeated Hollie Duncan's rink from the Royal Canadian Curling Club 7–6. It was Homan's 5th provincial title.

Qualification process
Nine teams will qualify from two cash spiels (two each), an open qualifier (two teams), plus the top three southern Ontario teams in the CTRS standings (as of December 1, 2019). Originally the event was to have just eight teams, but CurlON decided on December 9, 2019 to expand the field to nine teams with the addition of one team qualifying through their CTRS ranking.

Teams
The team lineups are as follows:

Round-robin standings
Final round-robin standings

Round-robin results
All draws are listed in Eastern Time (UTC−05:00).

Draw 1
Monday, January 27, 1:00 pm

Draw 2
Tuesday, January 28, 8:30 am

Draw 3
Tuesday, January 28, 4:00 pm

Draw 4
Wednesday, January 29, 12:15 pm

Draw 5
Wednesday, January 29, 7:45 pm

Draw 6
Thursday, January 30, 8:30 am

Draw 7
Thursday, January 30, 4:00 pm

Draw 8
Friday, January 31, 8:30 am

Draw 9
Friday, January 31, 4:00 pm

Tiebreaker
Saturday, February 1, 8:00 am

Playoffs

Semifinal
Saturday, February 1, 1:00 pm

Final
Saturday, February 1, 8:00 pm

Qualification

Cash Spiel #1
December 20–22, Guelph Curling Club, Guelph

Cash Spiel #2
January 10–12, 2020, West Northumberland Curling Club, Coburg

Open qualifier
January 17–19, 2020, Bayview Golf & Country Club, Thornhill

References

External link
Official site

Ontario Scotties Tournament of Hearts
Sport in Cornwall, Ontario
Ontario Scotties Tournament of Hearts
Ontario Scotties Tournament of Hearts
Ontario Scotties Tournament of Hearts
Ontario Scotties Tournament of Hearts